The Veterans Memorial Parkway is a four-lane parkway in the southwestern section of the state of Indiana. The highway is entirely within Vanderburgh County and the City of Evansville.

Route description
Veterans Memorial Parkway begins at an continuation of Riverside Drive, when Riverside Drive turns southeast and Veterans Memorial Parkway continues towards the south. Veterans Memorial Parkway parallels the Ohio River as a four-lane divided parkway. The road curves towards the southeast passing Sunset Park and passes through two traffic lights with Shawnee Drive and Waterworks Road. After the traffic lights the road passes through a wooded area before ending at the beginning of Interstate 69. In 2013 the traffic count along Veterans Memorial Parkway shows that 8,256 vehicles travel the highway, southeast of Shawnee Drive, on average each day.

Major intersections

See also

References

External links

Transportation in Evansville, Indiana
Transportation in Vanderburgh County, Indiana
Roads in Indiana
Parkways in the United States